Goethe-Schule, Goethe-Gymnasium, or similar, may refer to:

In Germany:
 Goethe-Gymnasium, Frankfurt
 Goethe-Gymnasium Karlsruhe

Outside Germany:
Goethe-Schule Buenos Aires, Argentina
Colegio Goethe, Asuncion, Paraguay

See also 
 Goethe-Institut
 Goethe-Oberlyzeum, Königsberg, East Prussia